Sally Conway (born 1 February 1987) is a Scottish retired judoka who competed for Team GB in the 2012 and the 2016 Rio Olympics in the women's 70 kg judo event. Conway won a bronze medal in the 2016 Olympics. She competed for Scotland at women's 70 kg judo event at the 2014 Commonwealth Games, where she won a bronze medal.

Biography
Conway was born in Bristol in 1987.
Conway took up judo at the age of ten in her home town of Bristol.  She trains at Judo Scotland's Edinburgh headquarters in Ratho, having previously trained at Bisham Abbey.

She competed for Scotland in the 2014 Commonwealth Games, where she won a bronze medal in the −70 kg division. At the 2012 Summer Olympics she beat Chad's Carine Ngarlemdana with an ippon score after scoring with a wazaari.  She then lost to second seed Edith Bosch, to a wazari after being penalised with a shido for backing off.

In 2013, she won the Olympic Athlete of the Year from the British Olympic Association and Female Player of the Year at the British Judo Awards. She was the only Scot to be part of the British team sent to the 2016 Judo World Championships.  Conway was selected for the 2016 European Championships.

She competed in the 2016 Summer Olympics in the 70 kg category, defeating Israel's Linda Bolder in the quarter-finals, and then defeating Austria's Bernadette Graf to win the bronze medal.

In May 2019, Conway was selected to compete at the 2019 European Games in Minsk, Belarus.

In August, Conway competed at the 2019 World Judo Championships held in Tokyo, Japan. She won her first three fight, losing to the eventual world champion Marie Eve Gahie of France, in the semi final. She beat Austrian Michaela Polleres in the bronze medal fight, earning her first senior medal at the World Championships.

In February 2021 Conway announced her retirement from judo. She was seven times champion of Great Britain, winning the middleweight division at the British Judo Championships in 2004, 2006, 2007, 2011, 2012, 2013 and 2014.

References

External links
 
 
 
 

1987 births
Living people
Scottish female judoka
Judoka at the 2012 Summer Olympics
Olympic judoka of Great Britain
Sportspeople from Bristol
Judoka at the 2014 Commonwealth Games
Judoka at the 2016 Summer Olympics
Medalists at the 2016 Summer Olympics
Olympic bronze medallists for Great Britain
Olympic medalists in judo
Commonwealth Games medallists in judo
Commonwealth Games bronze medallists for Scotland
European Games competitors for Great Britain
Judoka at the 2015 European Games
Judoka at the 2019 European Games
Scottish Olympic medallists
Medallists at the 2014 Commonwealth Games